The 130th Massachusetts General Court, consisting of the Massachusetts Senate and the Massachusetts House of Representatives, met in 1909 during the governorship of Eben Sumner Draper. Allen T. Treadway served as president of the Senate and Joseph Walker served as speaker of the House.

Senators

Representatives

See also
 1909 Massachusetts gubernatorial election
 61st United States Congress
 List of Massachusetts General Courts

References

Further reading

External links
 
 

Political history of Massachusetts
Massachusetts legislative sessions
massachusetts
1909 in Massachusetts